Charles Artie Ulmer (born July 30, 1973) is a former professional American football linebacker in the National Football League. He played for the Minnesota Vikings (1997), the Denver Broncos (1999), the San Francisco 49ers (2000), and the Atlanta Falcons (2001–2005).

1973 births
Living people
People from Effingham County, Georgia
Players of American football from Georgia (U.S. state)
American football linebackers
Valdosta State Blazers football players
Minnesota Vikings players
Frankfurt Galaxy players
Denver Broncos players
San Francisco 49ers players
Atlanta Falcons players

Ulmer was the highest draft pick out of Valdosta State until 2014 despite only playing in only 12 college games. He holds the record for most special teams tackles in a season for the Atlanta Falcons.